Butch Wedin (born 22 November 1940) is an American former ski jumper who competed in the 1960 Winter Olympics.

References

1940 births
Living people
American male ski jumpers
Olympic ski jumpers of the United States
Ski jumpers at the 1960 Winter Olympics
Place of birth missing (living people)